Life FM (call sign: 3GCB) is a community Christian radio station in the Victorian region of Gippsland.  The station broadcasts on the FM band at 103.9 MHz from Mt. Tassie near Traralgon. The Life FM studio and office is based in Sale. 3GCB broadcasts a variety of discussion and music programs for the region's Christian audience.

Programs
 Gippsland Extra -- local affairs program, hosted by Deb Bye
 A Different Perspective -- Daily messages by Berni Bymet
 Christian Working Women -- hosted by Mary Whelchel
 Focus on the Family -- an American imported program, hosted by Dr. James Dobson
 Insight for Living -- another American import, hosted by Chuck Swindoll
 Radio Dramas, including:
 Father Gilbert Mysteries
 Left Behind - Radio adaptation of the popular Christian novelisation series
 Amazing Grace

External links 

Radio stations in Victoria
Community radio stations in Australia
Christian radio stations in Australia
Radio stations established in 2003